Thomas Henry Burke (29 May 1829 – 6 May 1882) was an Irish civil servant who served as Permanent Under Secretary at the Irish Office. He was one of the key individuals responsible for administering the British occupation of Ireland before being killed during the Phoenix Park Murders on Saturday 6 May 1882. The killing was carried out by an Irish republican organisation called the Irish National Invincibles. The newly appointed Chief Secretary for Ireland Lord Frederick Cavendish, although not the intended victim, was assassinated alongside him while they walked through Phoenix Park in Dublin. The victims were stabbed in the neck and chest with surgical blades.

Thomas Burke was the Invincibles' intended target because he had been working for the Dublin Castle administration as head of the Civil Service for many years and was associated with the Irish Coercion Acts during the Land War, 1879–82. Irish nationalists referred to Burke as the "Castle rat".

Life
Thomas Henry Burke was one of six sons of William Burke of Knocknagur, Tuam, County Galway and Emma Dillon. He was born in Waterslade House, Tuam. He was educated at Oscott College, Sutton Coldfield, near Birmingham, and also in Belgium and Germany.

Burke's family was descended from that of Sir Ulick Burke of Glinsk, County Galway, on whom Charles I conferred a baronetcy in 1628. One brother was Sir Theobald Hubert Burke, 13th Baronet of Glinsk, another brother was the artist Augustus Nicholas Burke.

Burke's outlook
Burke was in favour of both Home Rule and reform of land issues, although as a civil servant he did not make his views known publicly. Lord Spencer described him as a "warm-hearted Irishman of strong national tendencies". Burke's support of various Crimes Acts imposed in Ireland was an issue which marked him out for assassination. Burke supported the retention of the unpopular Act in 1882, though his position was somewhat soft.

Burke's attitude towards land issues was demonstrated by his intervention on the Kirwan estate in Carraroe, Co. Galway in 1880. Numerous eviction notices were about to be served on tenants and the chances of confrontation were high. Burke used his personal acquaintance with the Kirwans to attempt to defuse the situation. Burke's report to Forster lamented the

Funeral and interment
Burke was interred in a private ceremony at Prospect cemetery, Glasnevin on Tuesday, 9 May. The grave is situated at Plot Zb 74 & 75. His remains were removed from the Chief Secretary's Lodge at 9  am, by hearse, followed by 43 carriages containing mourners. The coffin bearing the inscription, "Thomas Henry Burke, Born 29th May 1829, Died 6th May 1882, R.I.P." The Very Rev. Monsignor Lee, Dean of Dublin officiated, assisted by the Rev. E.J. Quinn and Rev. W.J. Hurley. Thomas Burke was laid to rest beside his father William, under a Celtic cross. The ornamental carved stone cover of the grave bears the inscription, "Sacred to the memory of Thomas Henry Burke Esq. Who was murdered in the Phoenix Park on May 6th, 1882. He pleased God and was beloved".

The second monument, composed mainly of black marble from Cong erected adjacent to the grave, bears the inscription,

Thomas' estate at death was £1901 11s. 4d. according to probate records of 7 June 1882.

Gallery

Memorial Prize
The Department of Education in Northern Ireland administers the Burke Memorial Fund which was established in 1883, a trust fund from which the payment of an annual prize of £150 is awarded to the best entrant to GCSE examinations taken in Northern Ireland.

Notes

References

External links

1829 births
1882 deaths
1882 murders in the United Kingdom
People from Tuam
Burials at Glasnevin Cemetery
Assassinated Irish people
Deaths by stabbing in Ireland
People murdered in Ireland
Under-Secretaries for Ireland
Thomas Henry
People from County Galway
Alumni of St Mary's College, Oscott
Deaths by stabbing in the United Kingdom
1880s murders in Ireland